The 2000 New Hampshire gubernatorial election took place on November 7, 2000. Incumbent Democratic Governor Jeanne Shaheen won re-election.

Democratic primary

Candidates
Jeanne Shaheen, incumbent Governor of New Hampshire
Mark Fernald, New Hampshire state senator

Results

Republican primary

Candidates
Gordon J. Humphrey, former U.S. senator
Jim Squires, former New Hampshire state senator
Jeffrey R. Howard, former Attorney General of New Hampshire, former United States Attorney for the District of New Hampshire
Fred Bramante, perennial candidate
Jim Marron

Results

Independent
Mary Brown, former New Hampshire State Senator

Libertarian
John J. Babiarz

Campaign

Debates
Complete video of debate, September 25, 2000
Complete video of debate, October 2, 2000
Complete video of debate, October 26, 2000
Complete video of debate, October 31, 2000

Results

References

See also
Source:

New Hampshire
2000
Gubernatorial